Karya may refer to:

Karya (Arcadia), a town of ancient Arcadia, Greece
Karya Köse (born 1997), Turkish female water polo player
Karya, Larissa, a municipal unit in Larissa regional unit, Greece
Karya, Lefkada, a municipal unit on Lefkada island, Greece
Kārya, cause and effect in Advaita Vedanta

See also 

Karyl